The Men's Points Race event at the 2010 South American Games was held on March 20.

Medalists

Results

Distance: 120 laps (30 km) with 12 sprint
Elapsed time: 38:20.826
Average Speed: 46.939 km/h

References
Report

Points M
Men's points race